3D World is a magazine and website published by Future plc whose main focus is 3D animation, visual effects, videogame design, illustration and architectural visualisation. 3D World appears every four weeks and is sold in the UK, the US, in mainland Europe, Australia, New Zealand, South Africa and many other countries. It is also sold as a digital replica for tablet computers.

Regular content
Exhibition: gallery of digitally created images submitted by readers.
Pre-Viz: news from the computer-generated imagery industry.
Feature: articles on a topic or project which have included areas such as open source software, film special effects, starting up a visual effects studio and machinima.
Tutorials: software tutorials for various 2D, 3D and compositing packages.
Q&A: includes "Question of the Month" and "Quick Question" where a team of industry specialists answer readers' questions on techniques to use in several software packages.
Reviews: reviews on training materials, hardware and software.

References

External links
3D World website

2000 establishments in the United Kingdom
Computer magazines published in the United Kingdom
Magazines established in 2000
Mass media in Bath, Somerset